Sarımeşe can refer to:

 Sarımeşe, Amasya
 Sarımeşe, Bayburt
 Sarımeşe, Çilimli